Liberty Hall is a comedy-drama play by the British writer R. C. Carton which premiered in London on 3 December 1892, at the St James's Theatre. It ran for 192 performances, until 20 May 1893. The cast was:
Mr Owen  – George Alexander
William Todman  – Edward Righton
Hon Gerald Harringay  – Ben Webster
Mr Pedrick –  Nutcombe Gould
J. Briginshaw  – H. H. Vincent
Robert Binks  – Richard Saker
Luscombe  – Vernon Sansbury
Mr Hickson  – Alfred Holles
Miss Hickson – Ailsa Craig
Crafer  –  Fanny Coleman
Amy Chilworth  – Maude Millett
Blanche Chillcorth –  Marion Terry
Source: The Era.
The play was revived at the St James's for a single matinée performance in March 1894 and 16 performances in November 1895.

Film adaptation
In 1914 the play was turned into a film of the same title directed by Harold M. Shaw.

References

Bibliography
 Goble, Alan. The Complete Index to Literary Sources in Film. Walter de Gruyter, 1999.
 

1892 plays
British plays adapted into films
Plays set in England
Plays by R. C. Carton
West End plays